Brian Ernest Orser,  (born 18 December 1961) is a Canadian former competitive and professional figure skater and coach to Olympic champions. He is the 1984 and 1988 Olympic silver medallist, 1987 World champion and eight-time (1981–88) Canadian national champion. At the 1988 Winter Olympics, the rivalry between Orser and American figure skater Brian Boitano, who were the two favorites to win the gold medal, captured media attention and was described as the "Battle of the Brians".

Orser turned professional in 1988 and skated with Stars on Ice for almost 20 years. As a coach, he has led both Yuna Kim (2010) and Yuzuru Hanyu (2014, 2018) to Olympic titles. He also coached Javier Fernández to Olympic bronze (2018) and the 2015 and 2016 World titles. He is a Skating Consultant at the Toronto Cricket Skating and Curling Club.

Early life
Brian Orser was born in Belleville, Ontario. He grew up in Penetanguishene. He is the youngest of five children.

Skating career
Orser won his first national title on the novice level in 1977. The following season, he went to Junior Worlds and placed 4th, behind eventual rival Brian Boitano. He added a second national title, this time at the junior level, to his resume in 1979.

In 1980, he moved up to the senior level. He won the bronze medal at his first senior international, the Vienna Cup, and then placed 4th at the Canadian Figure Skating Championships. That was the last time he would place off the podium at the national level.

In the 1980–1981 post-Olympic season, Orser began making his mark on the skating world. He won the silver at the Nebelhorn Trophy, placed 6th at Skate Canada, and then won his first of eight National titles. In his debut at Worlds, he placed 6th. The next season, he won his first medal at Skate Canada and moved up to 4th at Worlds. He won his first World medal in 1983, a bronze, positioning him well for the 1983–1984 Olympic season.

Orser became the second man to land the triple Axel when he performed it in winning his Canadian junior title in 1979, at a time when few senior skaters were even attempting it. Over the next few years, Orser performed the jump more frequently and more consistently than any other skater of the time. Orser became the first man to land the triple Axel at the Olympics when he landed it in his free skate at the 1984 Winter Olympics. He won the silver medal behind Scott Hamilton, and then won the silver at 1984 Worlds, again behind Hamilton. Only Orser's low placements in the compulsory figures prevented him from winning both titles.

In the 1984–1985 season, after Hamilton's retirement, Orser was seemingly poised to become the dominant champion. However, he had an imperfect worlds, and placed second to Alexander Fadeev, who also had the triple Axel in his repertoire. Orser resolved to begin including two Axels, not just one, in his free skate, in order to give himself an advantage over Fadeev. He finally won Worlds in 1987. At that competition he became the first skater at the World Championships to land two triple Axels in the free skate and three in the same competition.

Going into the 1988 Olympics, Orser worked with a sports psychologist on visual imagery. He and Brian Boitano were thrust into the Battle of the Brians, each being the other's main rival. Orser was undefeated in the 1986–1987 season and had not lost a competition since losing to Boitano at the 1986 Worlds. At the Olympics, Orser served as the flag-bearer for Canada during the opening ceremonies. He placed 3rd in compulsory figures segment of the competition, 1st in the short program, and second in the free skating, winning the silver medal overall. Brian Boitano won the gold medal, defeating Orser by 0.10 points.

He won the silver again at Worlds in 1988, after winning the free skate. Orser turned professional following that season. He had not placed off a podium at any competition since 1982. During his competitive career, he trained at the Mariposa School of Skating, originally located in Orillia, Ontario and was moved to Barrie, Ontario in 1988. An arena in Orillia was renamed for Orser in 1984.

Professional skating career
Orser began touring with Stars on Ice in 1988, soon after ending his competitive career. He would go on to appear with them on and off for nearly 20 years, skating his last with the show in 2007.

Orser starred in the 1990 German skating dance film Carmen on Ice, alongside his archrival Brian Boitano and Katarina Witt. The film told the story of Carmen wordlessly through ice skating; Orser played the part of Escamillo.

Orser performed in many ice shows and was known in the show business as one of the few people who could perform a backflip. Unfortunately, in 2007, he suffered from a broken wrist which occurred while stepping backward off the ice. Since then he has decided not to continue doing backflips and has greatly decreased his participation in ice shows.

Coaching career

He is the head instructor at the Toronto Cricket Skating and Curling Club along with Tracy Wilson.

His current students include: 

  Cha Jun-hwan – began coaching him in March 2015, coached him to win the 2022 Four Continents title and bronze at the 2018 Grand Prix of Figure Skating Final
  Jason Brown – began coaching in summer of 2018, coached him to win silver at the 2020 Four Continents Championships.
  Rika Kihira – initially intended to begin training in July 2020, but due to the COVID-19 pandemic they could not coach in-person until September 2021.
  Jin Boyang – Began coaching in 2022-23 season.
His former students include: 

  Yuzuru Hanyu – April 2012  to 2022 when Hanyu retired, coached him to win the 2014 and 2018 Olympic titles, the 2014 and 2017 World Championships titles, the 2020 Four Continents Championships title and 4 golds at Grand Prix of Figure Skating Final from 2013–2016.
  Conrad Orzel – coached from the summer of 2019 to August 2022.
  Evgenia Medvedeva – began coaching in June 2018, coached her to win bronze at the 2019 World Championships. Coached her until September 2020. 
  Ekaterina Kurakova – began coaching in December 2018. Coached her until September 2021
  Gabrielle Daleman – began coaching her in the spring of 2015, coached her to win bronze at the 2017 World Championships.
  Michaela Du Toit – began coaching her in 2012 
  Elizabet Tursynbayeva – began in 2013 to June 2018.
  Fedor Andreev – began coaching him in the fall of 2007 (Andreev had since switched to ice dancing).
  Sean Carlow – in 2007 and 2008.
  Alaine Chartrand – part-time, began coaching her in August 2014.
  Phoebe Di Tommaso in 2007 and 2008.
  Christina Gao – from 2009 to 2012, coached her to win bronze at the 2009 Junior Grand Prix Final.
  Javier Fernández – began coaching in mid-2011, coached him to win the bronze medal at the 2018 Winter Olympics, the 2015 and 2016 World Championships titles and to become the 7-time European Champion (2013–2019).
  Elene Gedevanishvili – began in mid-2011 to summer of 2013, coached her to win the 2012 European bronze medal.
 Stephen Gogolev – coached him to win the JGP Final at just 13 years old
 Joshi Helgesson – began coaching her in 2016.
  Yuna Kim – March 2007 to August 2010, coached her to win the 2009 World Championships and 2010 Olympic gold.
  Rachel Kirkland / Eric Radford – 2005 to 2009.
  Kwak Min-jeong – February to August 2010.
  Sonia Lafuente – began in October 2013 to 2014.
  Rylie McCulloch-Casarsa – coached her from 2006 to 2011.
  Nam Nguyen – began coaching him in the summer of 2012 to the spring of 2016, coached him to win the 2014 World Junior Championships.
  Adam Rippon – December 2008 to March 2010.
  Yun Yea-ji – worked with her in the summer of 2008 and summer of 2009 through September 2010.

Awards and honours
Orser was named a Member of the Order of Canada in 1985 and promoted to Officer in 1988.

Orser, along with his two co-stars, won an Emmy Award for his performance in Carmen on Ice after it appeared on HBO.

Orser has been elected to the following halls of fame:
 Canadian Sports Hall of Fame, 1989
 Canadian Olympic Hall of Fame, 1995
 Midland (Ontario) Sports Hall of Fame, 1998
 Penetanguishene Sports Hall of Fame, 2003
 World Figure Skating Hall of Fame, 2009
 Ontario Sports Hall of Fame, 2012

Personal life
Orser is openly gay. He was forced to reveal his sexuality in November 1998, when he lost a legal battle to prevent public disclosure when his former partner sued him for palimony. Orser initially feared the revelation of being gay would ruin his career, but he has since embraced support from other skaters and the public. Since 2008, he has been in a relationship with Rajesh Tiwari, a director of The Brian Orser Foundation. Harvey Brownstone, Canada's first openly gay judge, officiated at their wedding ceremony.

Programs

Competitive highlights

Bibliography
 Beisteiner, Johanna, Art music in figure skating, synchronized swimming and rhythmic gymnastics / Kunstmusik in Eiskunstlauf, Synchronschwimmen und rhythmischer Gymnastik. PhD dissertation, Vienna 2005 (German),  Austrian Library Network Catalogue. The dissertation contains an extensive description and analysis of Carmen on Ice (Chapter II/2, pages 105–162).

References

External links

 
 ESPN's brief history of gay athletes
 

1961 births
Living people
Canadian male single skaters
Figure skaters at the 1984 Winter Olympics
Figure skaters at the 1988 Winter Olympics
Canadian LGBT sportspeople
Members of the Order of Ontario
Officers of the Order of Canada
Olympic figure skaters of Canada
Olympic medalists in figure skating
Olympic silver medalists for Canada
Sportspeople from Belleville, Ontario
Skating people from Ontario
Gay sportsmen
LGBT figure skaters
World Figure Skating Championships medalists
Medalists at the 1984 Winter Olympics
Medalists at the 1988 Winter Olympics
21st-century Canadian LGBT people
Canadian figure skating coaches
Canadian gay men